Sir Donald Gorme Macdonald, 8th Laird of Sleat, and 1st Baronet (died 1643) was a Scottish laird.

He had succeeded his uncle, Donald Gorme Mor Macdonald, 7th Laird of Sleat, who died, in 1616, without heirs. He was created a Baronet of Nova Scotia, by King Charles I, with a special clause of
precedency placing him second of that order in Scotland. He adhered to the cause of Charles I, and died in 1643.

Marriage and children
He married Janet, the second daughter of Kenneth Mackenzie, 1st Lord Mackenzie of Kintail and they had several children:
Sir James Mor Macdonald, 9th Laird of Sleat
Mary Macdonald, who married Ewen Cameron of Lochiel
Alexander MacDonald of Sleat whose daughter married Lachlan Maclean, 3rd Laird of Torloisk
Colonel Donald of Castleton, soldier

References

Year of birth missing
1643 deaths
Donald Gorme Macdonald
Baronets in the Baronetage of Nova Scotia